The Marian Days (officially các Ngày Thánh Mẫu) is the main festival and pilgrimage for Vietnamese American Roman Catholics. The annual event in honor of the Blessed Virgin Mary has taken place the first weekend in August since 1978 on the  campus of the Congregation of the Mother of the Redeemer (CRM) in Carthage, Missouri. Tens of thousands of attendees come from throughout the United States, while non-Vietnamese locals and some visitors from Canada, Vietnam, and Australia also attend.

History

On April 30, 1975, 185 clergy – about half of the Congregation – left Vietnam as boat people just before the Fall of Saigon. They arrived in the United States at Fort Chaffee and other Operation New Arrivals refugee camps. Cardinal Bernard Francis Law, then Bishop of Springfield–Cape Girardeau, sponsored the priests and brothers, inviting them to rent a vacant Oblates of Mary Immaculate seminary, Our Lady of the Ozarks College, for a nominal price of $1, to use as their U.S. monastery. Between June 30 and September 3, 1975, nine priests, 154 brothers, and four novices arrived in Carthage, a predominantly Protestant town. The Overseas Congregation of the Mother Coredemptrix received formal recognition from the Congregation for the Evangelization of Peoples on September 16, 1975, and the congregation's Assumption Province was established on October 25, 1980, with Very Rev. Barnabus Maria Nguyễn Đức Kiên as the provincial. The Holy See gave the province a mission to minister to the Vietnamese American community.

The Congregation organized the inaugural Marian Day at its U.S. headquarters in 1978, in celebration of the Immaculate Heart of Mary. Around 1,500 Vietnamese Catholics from the Carthage area participated in the one-day retreat.

Ordinarily, Marian Days takes place without major incidents. The Carthage Police Department and event organizers enforce rules against indecency and drug use. Gang members are banned from the event, after two gangs killed a man during a fight in 2003. In 2008, 17 pilgrims died in a bus crash en route from Houston to Carthage.

Around 60,000 attended the 34th annual Marian Days, August 4–7, 2011. Presiders included Bishop Johnston and Bishop Emeritus Leibrecht of Springfield–Cape Girardeau, the local diocese; Archbishop Gregory Aymond of New Orleans, Bishop Tri Bửu Thiên of Cần Thơ; and Bishop Joseph Nguyễn Tấn Tước, the Coadjutor Bishop of Phú Cường. Around 120,000 people attended the 40th annual Marian Days, August 3–6, 2017. Presiders included Bishop Edward Rice and Bishop Emeritus John Leibrecht of the Diocese of Springfield-Cape Girardeau; the local diocese, Archbishop George Lucas of the Archdiocese of Omaha, Bishop Kevin Vann of the Diocese of Orange in California, and Auxiliary Bishop Joseph Binzer of the Archdiocese of Cincinnati. 

Other prominent presiders throughout the history of the event include: Venerable Cardinal Nguyễn Văn Thuận, Coadjutor Archbishop Emeritus of Saigon and nephew of Ngo Dinh Diem, who was detained by the communist government of Vietnam in a re-education camp for 13 years; Archbishop Emeritus Ngô Đình Thục of Huế and brother of Ngô Đình Diệm; Cardinal Raymond Leo Burke, then Archbishop of St. Louis; Cardinal Wilton Daniel Gregory, then Bishop of Belleville, Illinois and President of the United States Conference of Catholic Bishops; Archbishop Joseph Vũ Văn Thiên, then Bishop of Hải Phòng; and Cardinal Daniel DiNardo of Galveston-Houston and later President of the United States Conference of Catholic Bishops.

Through 2020-2021, the Congregation had decided to give Marian Days a two-year hiatus as a concern for the health of the pilgrims of Marian Days due to the COVID-19 pandemic that was spreading throughout the United States and the whole world.

Festivities

Each day of Marian Days is highlighted by a large, outdoor Mass on the CRM grounds. The Marian Days offer opportunities for Reconciliation and prayer. There is also times of benediction and workshop for young families, the youth, the Virgin Mary, Vocation, and much more. Mass is celebrated by many bishops, priests, and other religious brothers and sisters.

Pilgrims turn the surrounding area into a large campground, as many nearby residents allow pilgrims to erect tents on their lawns. The pilgrims that come earlier to set up tents are expected to stay there or risk losing their tent spots. On Wednesday before the event begins, the brothers and priests of the congregation hold a Mass and procession in honor of Saint Joseph, who is the patron of the Marian Days. Although the celebrations are centered on liturgy, they also feature a number of other events. Dioceses with large Vietnamese populations set up large tents to sell traditional Vietnamese food. Proceeds go to the parishes, orphanages, or a diocese in Vietnam such as Phú Cường. Other organizations, such as a local Knights of Columbus chapter, also serve food to pilgrims in tents. Each night, performers from Thúy Nga and other groups entertain the large crowds with both folk and popular Vietnamese music.

There are four Pontifical Masses, with two morning Masses and also many other Masses that take place outside the Main Complex during the day. The opening Mass on Thursday in honor of the Blessed Sacrament is opened by the diocesan bishop (if the bishop is not present, this role is given to the director.) Following the Mass is a Eucharistic Procession around Our Lady of Peace Memorial Garden. The following day sees a Pontifical Mass in honor of the 117 Vietnamese Martyr Saints, usually reserved to be presided by one of the guest bishops. On Saturday, the focal point begins with the Solemn Procession of the statue of Our Lady of Fátima and the Pontifical Mass in honor of the Immaculate Heart of Mary. These two celebrations are the central point of Marian Days every year.

At the end of the procession in honor of Our Lady of Fatima, two long firecrackers are lit, followed by the release of numerous balloons of all colors tied to two flags, one of blue and white, the Virgin Mary's colors, and the other of the South Vietnamese flag before that half of the country fell to communism. There also happens to be more balloons that are released afterward. This can be interpreted as symbolically offering the country of Vietnam to the Blessed Virgin Mary. There are also addresses written on the flags so that they could be returned. On Sunday, the closing Pontifical Mass is celebrated. Before Mass ends, the director for that year's Marian Days announces when the date of next year's event and then officially closes Marian Days.

See also
Roman Catholicism in Vietnam

Notes and references

External links

 Chi Dòng Đồng Công Hoa Kỳ – organizer website
 2012 – event history

Marian Days – Carthage Police Department

Catholic Church in the United States
Catholic Church in Vietnam
Vietnamese-American history
Overseas Vietnamese religious buildings and structures
Asian-American culture in Missouri
Shrines to the Virgin Mary
Tourist attractions in Jasper County, Missouri
Catholic Mariology
Recurring events established in 1978
Festivals in Missouri
1978 establishments in Missouri
Vietnamese-American culture in Missouri